Solarz is a surname. Notable people with the surname include:

 Jerzy Solarz (1930–1984), Polish gymnast
  (born 1969), Argentine actor
 Stephen Solarz (1940–2010), American politician

Polish-language surnames